Luma Lynai is a minor fictional character in the DC Universe, one of many to use the alias Superwoman.  She first appeared in the story "Superman's Super Courtship!" in Action Comics #289 (June 1962).

Fictional character biography
In "Superman's Super Courtship", Supergirl tries to find a mate for the lonely Superman. After match-making attempts with Helen of Troy and an adult Saturn Girl fail, Supergirl uses the computer in the Fortress of Solitude and discovers a super-powered woman on the distant planet of Staryl named Luma Lynai. 

Superman flies to Staryl and the two heroes immediately fall in love. Superman discovers that Luma Lynai's powers only work under the rays of an orange sun; Earth's sun yellow rays are as deadly to her as kryptonite is to Superman.  Luma, realizing that Earth needs Superman, tells him he must leave.

In a later reprint of the story, Luma's home star is shown as being blue, since at the time of the reprint Superman's powers were now being depicted as much weaker under an orange sun.

Luma Lynai appears in Superman's Girl Friend, Lois Lane #97 (November 1968), along with Lori Lemaris and Lyla Lerrol.  The story eventually reveals that the three women are actually aliens disguised as Superman's "L.L." initialled past loves.

Other appearances

Luma Lynai is one of the "ghosts" briefly seen in the empty "Planet Krypton" restaurant, in The Kingdom: Planet Krypton #1 (February 1999).

In JSA: Classified #3 (November 2005), one of Power Girl's many fictional origins claims she is the daughter of Captain Marvel and Supergirl from the future. The future Supergirl is shown wearing Luma's costume.

She is referenced as a loyal, groveling servant of the Earth-Three villain Ultraman (comics) in the New 52 issue of Justice League #48.

Notes

External links
Supermanica entry on Luma Lynai
Luma Lynai as Superman's Lover

DC Comics aliens
Comics characters introduced in 1962
DC Comics characters with superhuman strength
DC Comics female characters